Bazoches is a commune in the Nièvre department in central France.

Population

Personalities

 The Marquis de Vauban, Marshal of France and famous military engineer, bought the Château de Bazoches in 1675.

See also
Communes of the Nièvre department
Parc naturel régional du Morvan

References

Communes of Nièvre